Anthony Zahn (born October 14, 1976 - August 7, 2020) was an American cyclist who won a bronze medal at the 2008 Summer Paralympics in Beijing, China.

Zahn was from Riverside, California. He died on August 7, 2020, of pancreatic cancer at the age of 45.

References

Paralympic cyclists of the United States
Cyclists at the 2008 Summer Paralympics
Paralympic bronze medalists for the United States
Medalists at the 2008 Summer Paralympics
1976 births
2020 deaths
Place of birth missing
Paralympic medalists in cycling